Israel sent a delegation to compete at the 1980 Summer Paralympics in Arnhem, Netherlands. Its athletes finished twelfth in the overall medal count.

Nations at the 1980 Summer Paralympics
1980
Summer Paralympics